The Musée aéronautique et spatial Safran is a French private aviation museum located in Melun, Seine-et-Marne. Established in May 1989 the museum contains a large collection of historic and modern aircraft engines. These engines have been produced by various French engine manufacturers such as Gnome et Rhône and Snecma which are now part of the present day Safran company. The latter is the creator and manager of the museum.

The main exhibits are piston engines and turbojets that powered aircraft as well as rocket engines used for aircraft and spacecraft. All the exhibits were developed and produced by companies that were eventually merged into the Safran group.

History

In 1985 the Musée de l'Air et de l'Espace, Le Bourget held more than 1,000 historic aero engines. Snecma signed an agreement to allow their restoration and future care. The agreement stated that employees of Snecma would restore the engines as volunteers. In 1987 Snecma decided to create a new museum to display the restored engines, the museum was created on the site of its Villaroche establishment in Melun in a former seaplane hangar of 4,000 m². Inaugurated on 31 May 1989 the 'Association of Friends of the Museum Safran' manages the museum. In 2013 the museum was expanded to accommodate a section on space propulsion.

Collections

The museum's collections are presented with a parallel theme depicting the history of aviation and aerospace. Exhibits include aircraft, piston engines, gas turbine engines, rocket engines, and aerospace items.

Piston engines

Radial and rotary engines produced by Gnome and Gnome et Rhône
Hispano-Suiza inline engines
Renault inline engines

Gas turbines
CFM International CFM56
General Electric GE36 (mock-up)
Rolls-Royce/Snecma Olympus 593
Snecma Atar
Snecma M88
Turbomeca Astazou

Rocket engines

Intercontinental ballistic missile stages
Satellite rocket engines 
Viking
Vulcain

Aircraft

Blériot XI
Sud Aviation Emouchet
Sud Aviation Vautour

Other exhibits

The companies inherited by the Safran group also manufactured products unrelated to aviation which are also displayed. These exhibits include Gnome et Rhône motorcycles, missiles, submarines and tractors.

Visitor information 

The museum is located in Réau in Melun in the south of the Seine-et-Marne department. It is open every Wednesday and last Saturday of the month. Groups of at least 10 people can visit on other days by making a reservation. Admission is free.

See also
List of aerospace museums

References

External links

 Official Website

Aerospace museums in France
Safran Group
Museums established in 1989
1989 establishments in France